Amity Law School is a private law college situated in Kadampukur, close to Action Area - II of New Town, Kolkata, in the state of West Bengal. It was established in the year 2015. The college is constituent college of Amity University, Kolkata. This college is also approved by the Bar Council of India (BCI).

Courses
The college offers the following Undergraduate & Postgraduate courses:
 5 Years BA. LLB (H);
 5 Years BBA. LLB (H);
 5 Years BCom. LLB (H);
 3 Years LLB;
 1 Year LLM ( Business Law)

References

Law schools in West Bengal
Educational institutions established in 2015
2015 establishments in West Bengal